This is a list of German television related events from 1985.

Events
21 March - Wind are selected to represent Germany at the 1985 Eurovision Song Contest with their song "Für alle". They are selected to be the thirtieth German Eurovision entry during Ein Lied für Göteborg held at the German Theatre in Munich.

Debuts

ARD
7 January – Der Sonne entgegen (1985)
14 January – Gespenstergeschichten (1985)
 31 January – Känguru (1985–1986)
 22 March – ...Erbin sein - dagegen sehr (1985)
 3 April – Schöne Ferien (1985)
 25 April – Zentrale Bangkok (1985)
 27 June – Ein Mann macht klar Schiff (1985–1986)
 July – War was, Rickie? (1985)
 18 September – Levin und Gutman (1985)
11 October – 
Ich, Christian Hahn (1985–1986)
Das Rätsel der Sandbank (1985)
15 November – Fritz Golgowsky (1985–1986)
8 December – Lindenstraße (1985–2020)

ZDF
23 January – Ein Heim für Tiere (1985–1992)
19 February –  (1985)
28 April – Glücklich geschieden (1985)
30 August – Alte Gauner (1985)
1 September – Via Mala (1985)
12 September – Die Nervensäge (1985–1986)
22 October – The Black Forest Clinic (1985–1989)
5 December – Oliver Maass (1985)

DFF
4 January –   Die Leute von Züderow (1985)
27 January –  Bei Hausers zu Hause (1985)
8 March –   Johann Sebastian Bach (1985)
17 May –   Zahn um Zahn (1985–1988)
10 November –  Der Sohn des Schützen (1985)

International
2 January -  The Love Boat (1977–1986) (Sat.1)
29 May -  Hill Street Blues (1981–1987) (ZDF)
27 August -  Danger Mouse (1981–1992) (ZDF)

BFBS
19 May -  Bertha (1985–1986)
 T-Bag (1985–1992)
 Who Sir? Me Sir? (1985)
/ Dogtanian and the Three Muskehounds (1981–1982)
 Dodger, Bonzo and the Rest (1985–1986)
 Puddle Lane (1985–1989)
 Mop and Smiff (1985)
 Tales from Fat Tulip's Garden (1985)
 Dempsey and Makepeace (1985–1986)
 Gems (1985–1988)
 EastEnders (1985–present)

Television shows

1950s
Tagesschau (1952–present)

1960s
 heute (1963-present)

1970s
 heute-journal (1978-present)
 Tagesthemen (1978-present)

1980s
Wetten, dass..? (1981-2014)

Ending this year

Births

Deaths